Ólafur Páll Snorrason (born 22 April 1982) is Icelandic football coach and former player.

Playing career
Born in Reykjavík, Ólafur played as a right winger for Valur, Bolton Wanderers, Fjölnir, Stjarnan, Fylkir and FH. When he joined English club Bolton Wanderers he became the fourth Icelandic player at the club.

After playing for them at youth level, he made one international appearance for Iceland in 2010.

Coaching career
He left his role as Fjölnir manager in October 2018, after one season with the club.

References

1982 births
Living people
Olafur Pall Snorrason
Olafur Pall Snorrason
Olafur Pall Snorrason
Olafur Pall Snorrason
Olafur Pall Snorrason
Bolton Wanderers F.C. players
Olafur Pall Snorrason
Olafur Pall Snorrason
Olafur Pall Snorrason
Olafur Pall Snorrason
Olafur Pall Snorrason
Association football forwards
Olafur Pall Snorrason
Olafur Pall Snorrason
Expatriate footballers in England